The Courage World Tour is the fourteenth concert tour by Canadian singer Celine Dion, in support of her English-language studio album Courage (2019). It was her first world tour in over a decade, since her Taking Chances World Tour. The tour began in Quebec City, Canada, on 18 September 2019.

Background
The Courage World Tour was officially announced on 3 April 2019 at The Theatre at Ace Hotel in Downtown Los Angeles. The event was live streamed on Dion's official Facebook page. Tickets went on general sale on 12 April 2019. Earlier the same month, following pre-sale demand, additional shows in Montreal, Toronto, Boston and Miami were added,  with two extra shows were added in Montreal, one in Newark and one in New York City to meet demand later. On 11 April 2019, extra dates for Quebec City, Montreal and Ottawa were announced.

On-site rehearsals were held at Videotron Centre in Quebec City starting early September, with Dion and her team of 110 staying at the new hotel Le Capitole for the duration of their time in Quebec City. In September 2019, ConcertFrance announced that Dion will perform at the Paris La Défense Arena in Nanterre, France on 26 June 2020. That same month, the first four shows in Montreal, scheduled to take place 26, 27 and 30 September, and 1 October 2019, were postponed due to a throat virus; the shows were rescheduled for 18, 19, 21 and 22 November. European dates, as well as additional dates in New York City, San Diego, Los Angeles, and Vancouver were revealed by SoldOutTicketBox.com on 26 September 2019. In March 2020, Dion rescheduled two dates in Washington, D. C. and Pittsburgh, due to the "common cold," despite reports being related to the COVID-19 pandemic in the United States. In 2020, Dion rescheduled the North American leg of the tour to 2021, due to the COVID-19 pandemic.

In February 2021, European and UK dates from 19 March to 16 June 2021 were rescheduled to recommence in May 2022, due to the COVID-19 pandemic in Europe. Subsequent European dates from 19 June to 25 July 2021 were rescheduled to recommence in May 2023.

In January 2022, Dion cancelled the remainder of the 2022 North American dates, citing "ongoing recovery" from health issues.

In April 2022, Dion rescheduled all 2022 European dates for 2023, citing ongoing recovering from health issues.

In December 2022, Dion cancelled 8 shows scheduled from May to July 2023, and rescheduled 23 European dates, scheduled for February to April 2023, to March and April 2024. Dion is scheduled to perform the remaining 19 European dates from August to October 2023.

Critical reception
The Courage World Tour received positive reviews. Billboard praised the song choices, the mix of older hits like "Beauty and the Beast" with Dion's new songs like "Courage", and also the "extraordinary" encore: "My Heart Will Go On" and John Lennon's "Imagine". It also praised Dion's voice, her outfits and drones emulating stars, water, and even the Heart of the Ocean diamond during the "My Heart Will Go On" performance. Billboard called the two-hours concert stunning and showstopping. The Courage World Tour was also chosen as one of the best live shows of 2019 by Billboard. Variety also gave a positive review on her Brooklyn show saying: "she’s still one of the best in the business. It’s hard to overstate just how pitch-perfect Dion’s singing is." Moreover, they also stated that it's hard to believe that she’s never been asked to headline the Super Bowl halftime show and concluded by stating: "After all these years as a powerhouse diva, she’s still managing to top herself." The Charlotte Observer gave their take on her show at Spectrum Center saying: "There might not be a human being alive who can belt ballads with as much power and control and grace as Celine Dion." Courier Journal gave a positive review on her first-ever Louisville show saying: "Dion is in a league of her own. Her vocals were spot on all night and after she continued to hit note after incredible note over and over again, you were left wondering at some points "is she even real?".

Commercial reception

According to figures reported to Billboard Boxscore, Dion topped the 30 November-dated Hot Tours recap with $33.2 million from the tour's first 19 shows. She grossed $7 million in four shows at Montreal's Bell Centre, sold out at 53,864 tickets. The opening leg averaged out to $1.747 million and 12,414 tickets per show. These figures boosted Dion's career-total to $1.115 billion and 8.8 million tickets sold, as reported to Billboard Boxscore.

Billboard named the tour as 2020's top pop tour, grossing $84.6 million and 498,000 tickets sold. Dion also became the highest female touring act of 2020 and second overall, behind Elton John. The tour was named the most successful music tour in North America during 2020 with $71.2 million gross revenue.

In Paris, all general public tickets (200,000) available for her 6 concert shows at Paris La Défense Arena were sold out immediately in just 90 minutes.

According to Pollstar, Courage World Tour has sold 646,346 tickets across 52 shows, and overall tour revenue totaled $104 million as of March 2021.

Set list
This set list is from the 18 September 2019 show at Videotron Centre in Quebec City. It is not intended to represent every show.

 "It's All Coming Back to Me Now"
 "Dans un autre monde"
 "Terre"
 "À vous"
 "I'm Alive"
 "The Power of Love"
 "L'amour existe encore"
 "Beauty and the Beast"
 "Encore un soir"
 "You're the Voice"
 "Regarde-moi"
 "Un garçon pas comme les autres (Ziggy)"
 "Courage"
 "All by Myself"
 "Lying Down"
 "Tous les blues sont écrits pour toi"
 "S'il suffisait d'aimer"
 "Let's Dance" / "Another One Bites the Dust" / "Flying on My Own" / "Kiss" / "River Deep, Mountain High" / "Lady Marmalade"
 "My Heart Will Go On"
 "Pour que tu m'aimes encore"

Notes
 Beginning with the show in Cleveland, Dion added "That's the Way It Is", "If You Asked Me To", "Love Can Move Mountains", "The Prayer", "To Love You More", "The Reason", "Because You Loved Me" and "Imagine"; she removed "Dans un autre monde", "Terre", "À vous", "L'amour existe encore", "Encore un soir", "Regarde-moi", "Un garçon pas comme les autres (Ziggy)", "S'il suffisait d'aimer", "Pour que tu m'aimes encore" and "Flying on My Own".
 Beginning with the show in Montreal, Dion replaced "Lying Down" with "Imperfections".
 During the shows in Boston, Dion performed "Happy Xmas (War Is Over)" in place of "Imagine".
 During the first show in Miami, Dion performed "Over the Rainbow" in place of "Imagine" in tribute to her mother, who died earlier that day.
 During her second Montreal show on 19 February 2020, Dion invited Mathieu Lafontaine of the band Bleu Jeans Bleu onstage to perform the band's song "Coton ouaté" as a duet.

Tour dates

Cancelled shows

References

Notes

Citations

External links
Celine Dion: In Concert

2019 concert tours
2020 concert tours
Celine Dion concert tours
Concert tours postponed due to the COVID-19 pandemic
2023 concert tours
2024 concert tours